Serum amyloid A-like 1 (also known as SAAL1, Synoviocyte proliferation-associated in collagen-induced arthritis 1, and SPACIA1) is a protein in humans encoded by the SAAL1 gene.

Gene

Locus 
The human SAAL1 gene is located at position 11p15.1 on the minus strand spanning from base pairs 18080292-18106082 (25,790 bases). It has 12 exons and 11 introns and encodes a single isoform.

Members of the serum amyloid-A family such as SAA1 reside in the same loci as SAAL1.

Promoter 
The promoter region (GXP_169676) is predicted to span from basepairs 18105980-18107207 and extends into the first exon of SAAL1. Predicted transcription factors include TATA binding factors, NF-κB, and KLF4, KLF5, and KLF6.

Expression 
SAAL1 is ubiquitously expressed at moderate levels across all human tissues with highest expression in testes as determined by RNA-sequencing and microarray expression profiling.

Transcript 
Predicted 5' UTR binding proteins of the human SAAL1 transcript include SRSF3 and FXR2. Predicted 3' UTR binding proteins include SRSF5 and U2AF2. All predicted proteins are involved in mRNA splicing, export, and translation.

Protein structure

General properties 
The SAAL1 protein has a single known isoform consisting of 474 amino acids with a molecular weight of 53.5 kDa. The unmodified SAAL1 protein is acidic with an isoelectric point of 4.4.

Composition 
SAAL1 is abundant in aspartic acid (7.8% by composition) and deficient in glycine (3.4% by composition)compared to other human proteins. It also has 44 more aspartic acid and glutamic acid residues compared to lysine and arginine, indicating an overall negative charge. Two negatively charged and glutamic acid abundant segments were identified and labeled in the SAAL1 conceptual translation.

Domains and motifs 
SAAL1 contains an armadillo-like fold with an enveloped fungal symportin-1 like region. Other motifs were predicted by ELM and MyHits Motif Scan.

Sub-cellular localization 
Immunofluorescent staining has identified SAAL1 localization in the nucleus of Caco-2 cells. However, western blotting of hepatocellular carcinoma cell lines identified SAAL1 localization in the cytoplasm with minor amounts in the cell membrane and nucleus.

Post-translational modifications 
SAAL1 undergoes phosphorylation at two experimentally verified sites: Ser6 and Thr387. Predicted post-translational modifications are detailed in the following table.

Clinical significance 
SAAL1 overexpression has been correlated with the proliferation of rheumatoid and osteoarthritic synovial fibroblasts as well as disease progression. RNAi knockouts of SAAL1 reduced arrested fibroblasts in G0/G1 phase and reduced proliferation by 20% with a 50% reduction when fibroblasts were stimulated by TNF-α. Stability assays reveal that SAAL1 promotes G1/S transition via CDK6 mRNA stabilization. This finding was corroborated by SAAL1 knockdowns in hepatocellular carcinomas which also demonstrated impaired HGF-induced migration and increased sensitivity to sorafenib and foretinib treatment. Additionally, SAAL1 is overexpressed in hepatocellular carcinoma cells and in chondrocytes stimulated by interleukin-1 beta, but this effect is diminished in the presence of glucosamine.
 
Studies of the rock bream SAAL1 ortholog noted an increase in gene expression in response to bacterial and viral pathogens. Human SAAL1 has been reported to interact with the M protein of SARS-Cov-2, Orf4 of Kaposi's sarcoma-associated herpesvirus, and the M and M2 proteins of influenza A. It has also been reported as an interferon stimulator and TRIM25 interactor. Other interacting proteins include PNKD (which plays a role in cardiac hypertrophy via NF-κB signaling), TMIGD3(which inhibits NF-κB activity), and MARK3.

Evolution

Homology 
BLAST searches have found homologs for SAAL1 in organisms as distant as plants, though few orthologs were found for fungi. The following table provides a sample of the ortholog space. Vertebrate orthologs share >50% identity with human protein SAAL1 while displayed invertebrates and non-metazoan orthologs have 30% or less identity.

SAAL1 exists in up to four isoforms in other vertebrates. Across these orthologs, it is the only member of its gene family.

A multiple sequence alignment of the vertebrate homologs demonstrated high conservation of the protein, especially in the armadillo-type fold and fungal symportin-1 like motif. An alignment of invertebrate and non-metazoan orthologs indicates drastic changes in the protein's primary structure, but some conservation in the labeled motifs. Highly similar amino acids were colored red and less similar amino acids were colored blue; "*" denotes conservation and "." denotes similarity.

Phylogeny 
The date of divergence from the human ortholog was compared to the corrected % divergence for SAAL1 orthologs.  Compared against data for cytochrome c and fibrinogen alpha proteins in similar orthologs, SAAL1 evolved at a moderate rate.

References 

Proteins